Forward March! is the debut mini-album by Portsmouth-based British band, The Strange Death of Liberal England. It was released by Fantastic Plastic in 2007.

Track listing
 "Modern Folk Song" – 4:23
 "Oh Solitude" – 2:48
 "A Day Another Day" – 4:12
 "An Old Fashioned War" – 2:50
 "Mozart on 33" – 3:15
 "I Saw Evil" – 4:47
 "God Damn Broke and Broken Hearted" – 3:36
 "Summer Gave us Sweets but Autumn Wrought Division" – 5:29

References

2007 debut albums
The Strange Death of Liberal England (band) albums
Fantastic Plastic Records albums